Douglas is an unincorporated community in St. Clair County, Illinois, United States.

References

Unincorporated communities in St. Clair County, Illinois
Unincorporated communities in Illinois